Yisroel Yaakov Fisher (1928–2003), was a leading posek, Av Beit Din of the Edah HaChareidis and rabbi of the Zichron Moshe neighbourhood in Jerusalem.

He was born in Jerusalem in 1928 to Rabbi Aharon Fisher, a prominent member of the Perushim community. He was named after the political activist Jacob Israël de Haan who had been assassinated four years earlier. As a teenager he studied in the Etz Chaim Yeshiva and became a close student of Rabbi Isser Zalman Meltzer. He was later married to the daughter of Rabbi Zelig Wallis and they settled in Batei Horodno area of Jerusalem.

In 1961 was appointed as a moreh tzedek and two year later, in 1963, he was invited to serve as rabbi of the Great Synagogue of Zikhron Moshe. In 1974 he was made a member of the Badatz of the Edah HaChareidis. In 1996 he was appointed Av Beit Din of the Edah HaChareidis.

He died in 2003 and is buried on Har HaMenuchot.

Works
Even Yisroel — several volumes of responsa

Sources
HaRav Yisroel Yaakov Fisher, by Betzalel Kahn (Dei'ah veDibur)

1928 births
2003 deaths
20th-century rabbis in Jerusalem
Rabbis of the Edah HaChareidis